Liberating Ourselves Locally is a makerspace/hackerspace in the Fruitvale district of Oakland, California. It is part of the Bay Area Consortium of Hackerspaces (BACH).

LOL! is a place where people can learn new skills, from soldering to video game design, and operates on the principle that members of the local community can be involved in all aspects of creating things that sustain people, such as food, clothing, energy, technology, shelter, and art.

History

LOL! was founded in 2011 by a group of people including Jen-Mei Wu and software engineer Praveen Sinha.

Mentors from many professional fields volunteer their time to share their professional knowledge. LOL! has close ties with other San Francisco Bay Area hackerspaces including Sudo Room, Noisebridge, and Mothership HackerMoms.

Project areas

 Art
 Computer hardware
 Computer programing
 Crafts
 Electronics
 Politics
 Sewing
 Software
 Technology
 Textiles

See also

 Double Union

References

External links
 

Culture of Oakland, California
DIY culture
Hackerspaces
Hackerspaces in the San Francisco Bay Area
Maker Studios